Ghastly Funeral Theatre (Japanese 葬式劇場, Sōshiki gekijō) is an EP by the band Sigh. Ghastly Funeral Theatre marked the beginning of Sigh's progressive and avant-garde experimentation prior to the release of Hail Horror Hail.

The album was reissued on vinyl on January 26, 2010 by The Crypt, and included the Tragedies demo from 1990. It was limited to 500 copies: 250 of which were in black, the other 250 were in green.

Track listing
 "Intro: Soushiki" ("葬式") – 1:18
 "Shingontachikawa" ("真言立川") – 5:26
 "Doman Seman" ("ドーマン・セーマン") – 5:32
 "Imiuta" ("忌み歌") - 3:14
 "Shikigami" ("式神") – 6:21
 "Outro: Higeki" ("悲劇") – 1:31

Personnel
 Mirai: vocals, bass guitar, piano, keyboards
 Shinichi: acoustic & electric guitar
 Satoshi: drums, percussion

References

Sigh (band) albums
1997 EPs